"Psirens" is the first episode of science fiction sit-com Red Dwarf Series VI and the 31st in the series run. It was first broadcast on the British television channel BBC2 on 7 October 1993. Written by Rob Grant and Doug Naylor and directed by Andy de Emmony. The episode – which involves Psirens who try to lure the crew to them to feast on their brains – had its script published before the episode was broadcast.

Plot
Dave Lister awakes aboard Starbug with amnesia, and encounters Kryten in the ship's dining area. After being helped by him to recover, and bringing both Arnold Rimmer and Cat out of hibernation, the mechanoid explains their situation – for the past 200 years, the crew have been chasing after Red Dwarf through its vapour trail, after an unknown party stole it from them following their adventure on the SSS Esperanto, with Holly having gone offline as a result. Proceeding to continue the pursuit, the group attempt to catch up by taking a shortcut through an asteroid belt, only to discover it is a ship graveyard inhabited by Psirens – shape-changing GELFs who prey on unwary travellers by luring them with psychic visions. Despite their best efforts, the Psirens manage to cause them to crash on an asteroid, forcing Lister to attempt to pry them loose from it.

Once outside, a Psiren begins to overpower him with a powerful illusion, but is killed by a second Psiren disguised as Kryten, whom Lister promptly kills when it calls him "Dave", something the real Kryten would never do. Managing to get back aboard, the others find that a third Psiren has disguised itself as Lister, leaving them unable to determine who is the real one and forced to hold both at gunpoint. To determine which one is false, the crew ask them to play guitar, and shoot the fake when it plays well, knowing the real Lister is terrible despite his belief that he is excellent, determining the Psiren's illusion was based on this belief that his genuine skill set. Wounded, the Psiren disappears, and uses illusions to separate Kryten and put him in the waste compactor, whereupon it proceeds to attack Lister and Cat, after Rimmer's light bee runs out of energy. Kryten, surviving the compactor, manages to kill the Psiren by crushing it with his now cubed-shaped body, allowing the crew to recover and continue pursuing Red Dwarf.

Production
This episode features the first appearance of Kochanski since series 2's "Stasis Leak", albeit as a Psiren illusion used to fool Lister. Clare Grogan returned to play Kochanski for the last time. Samantha Robson plays a Psiren that lures him with an illusion of one of his teenage fantasies - Pete Tranter's sister. Jenny Agutter plays another Psiren, this time an illusion of Kryten's creator Professor Mamet. Anita Dobson also appears as Captain Tau, part of the Psiren illusion to fool Lister.  The hands of Phil Manzanera appear in the scene in which the fake Lister plays the guitar brilliantly. Zoe Hilson and Elizabeth Anson both appear as Temptresses in a Psiren illusion to tempt the Cat. Race Davies and Janan Kubba had been cast as temptresses but in the end were "not used".

Anita Dobson's guest role came about when Grant and Naylor approached her partner (later husband) Brian May about providing his hands for the sequence where the fake Lister plays guitar. Although May was unavailable, Dobson agreed to play the part of Captain Tau when Grant and Naylor mentioned the possibility to her. The two regretted that—had they known that Dobson was willing and available, they would have written something more substantial for her.

The book Primordial Soup: The Least Worst Scripts contained the script for the "Psirens" episode. Edited by Grant Naylor and published by Penguin Books, it was released just a few months before the episode was broadcast.

Cultural references
The concept of sirens creating illusions to lure unwary travellers to their deaths first appears in Homer's Odyssey, and this concept is much-repeated in Western film and literature.

Among the derelicts in the asteroid field are models of the Narcissus escape shuttle from Alien (1979), the Eagle from Space: 1999 (1975) and a Klingon Vor'cha attack cruiser from Star Trek: The Next Generation.

Reception
The episode was first broadcast on the British television channel BBC2 on 7 October 1993 in the 9:00pm time slot. The ratings had yet again increased on the previous series, Sci-Fi.com stated that "though no less funny, the show looks more and more like conventional, plot-driven science fiction." while Sci-Fi Dimensions said "the show was at its best when it was fresh" before adding "these slightly slicker episodes, with their confusing discontinuity, are still some damned funny stuff."

References

External links

Series VI episode guide at www.reddwarf.co.uk

Television episodes about genetic engineering
Red Dwarf VI episodes
1993 British television episodes